The 2007 Delaware State Hornets football team represented Delaware State University as a member of the Mid-Eastern Athletic Conference (MEAC) in the 2007 NCAA Division I FCS football season. They were led by fourth-year head coach Al Lavan and played their home games at Alumni Stadium. They finished the season with 10–2 overall, won the MEAC title with a 9–0 mark in conference play and lost to Delaware in the First Round of the NCAA Division I playoffs. The 2007 Hornets squad won the black college football national championship as awarded by the American Sports Wire and as the national runner-up behind  as awarded by SBN.

Schedule

References

Delaware State
Delaware State Hornets football seasons
Black college football national champions
Mid-Eastern Athletic Conference football champion seasons
Delaware State Hornets football